See How She Runs is a 1978 American TV movie starring Joanne Woodward who won an Emmy for her performance.

Plot
A 40 year old divorced school teacher decides to enter the Boston Marathon.

Production
At one stage the film was going to be directed by Paul Newman.

Reception
The film was seen by 35 million.

References

External links
See How She Runs at IMDb
See How She Runs at TCMDB
See How She Runs at Letterbox DVD

1978 television films
1978 films
Films scored by Jimmie Haskell
Films directed by Richard T. Heffron